Isograptidae is an extinct family of graptolites.

Genera
List of genera from Maletz (2014):

†Arienigraptus Yu & Fang, 1981
†Cardiograptus Harris & Keble, 1916 in Harris (1916)
†Isograptus Moberg, 1892
†Oncograptus Hall, 1914
†Paracardiograptus Mu & Lee, 1958
†Parisograptus Chen & Zhang, 1996
†Procardiograptus Xiao, Xia & Wang 1985
†Proncograptus Xiao, Xia & Wang, 1985
†Pseudisograptus Beavis, 1972
†Xiushuigraptus Yu & Fang, 1983

References

Graptolites
Prehistoric hemichordate families